The McPherson County Courthouse, located on South Dakota Highway 10 in Leola, South Dakota, was built in 1928.  It was listed on the National Register of Historic Places in 1986.

It was designed by architects Buechner & Orth.

The courtroom is equipped with panic buttons.

References

External links
McPherson County Court, official site

Courthouses on the National Register of Historic Places in South Dakota
Renaissance Revival architecture in South Dakota
Government buildings completed in 1928
McPherson County, South Dakota
Courthouses in South Dakota